Neve Yam (lit. Sea Oasis) is a kibbutz in northern Israel. Located around twenty kilometres south of Haifa, it falls under the jurisdiction of Hof HaCarmel Regional Council.

History
The kibbutz was established in 1939 by members of the Gordonia youth movement, and served as a base for the Palyam. Nearby is a geyser that is activated when the sea is stormy.

The kibbutz has fallen into financial difficulties and is attempting a rejuvenation project by attracting twenty-seven families from Elei Sinai, Dugit, and Nisanit, who had been evicted from the northern Gaza Strip as part of the Israel's unilateral disengagement plan of 2005 and allotting them land adjacent to the sea for permanent housing. The new project would give the evictees a housing solution similar to their original homes. The Israel Union for Environmental Defense is struggling to prevent the project, which it deems is too close to the beach.

Notable people

 Tzipi Shavit

References

Kibbutzim
Kibbutz Movement
Populated places established in 1939
1939 establishments in Mandatory Palestine
Populated places in Haifa District